February 7 - Eastern Orthodox liturgical calendar - February 9

All fixed commemorations below are observed on February 21 by Eastern Orthodox Churches on the Old Calendar.

For February 8th, Orthodox Churches on the Old Calendar commemorate the Saints listed on January 26.

Feasts

 Afterfeast of the Meeting of our Lord in the Temple.

Saints

 Prophet Zechariah, of the Twelve Minor Prophets (520 BC)
 Virgin-martyrs Martha and Mary, sisters, and the monk Lukarion, martyrs by crucifixion. (see also February 6 - Slavic)
 Martyrs Nicephorus and Stephen.
 Martyr Pergetos.
 Great martyr Theodore Stratelates "the General" of Heraclea (319)
 Saint Agathangelus, Bishop of Damascus (c. 325)
 Venerable ascetics Philadelphus and Polycarp, monastics, reposed in peace.

Pre-Schism Western saints

 Saint Juventius of Pavia,  Bishop of Pavia (1st century)
 Martyrs Paul, Lucius and Cyriacus, in Rome.
 Martyr Cointha (Conitus) of Alexandria (249)
 Saints Jacut and Guethenoc, disciples of St Budoc, they were driven from Britain to Brittany (5th century)
 Saint Honoratus of Milan, Bishop of Milan and Confessor (570)
 Saint Kewe (Kigwe, Ciwa), a saint venerated in Gwent in Wales.
 Saint Oncho (Onchuo),  a pilgrim, poet, and guardian of holy relics and the Celtic tradition (c. 600)
 Saint Nicetius of Besançon  (Nizier), Bishop of Besançon in France and a friend of St Columbanus of Luxeuil (611)
 Saint Paulus of Verdun, Bishop of Verdun, renowned for miracles (c. 649)
 Saint Ælfflæd of Whitby (Elfleda), Abbess of Whitby Abbey (714)
 Saint Cuthmann of Steyning, a confessor who lived a holy life as a shepherd near Steyning in Sussex in England (8th century)
 Saint Mlada (Mileda, Mary), a Benedictine abbess and founder of the first monastery in Bohemia (994)
 Saint Meingold of Huy, a holy man who lived in Huy on the Meuse and was venerated in Belgium (10th century)

Post-Schism Orthodox saints

 Saint Sabbas II, Archbishop of Serbia (1271)
 Saint Makarios, Bishop of Paphos on Cyprus (1688)
 Saint Lyubov of Ryazan, Fool-for-Christ (1921)

New martyrs and confessors

 New Hieromartyrs Andrew Dobrynin, Archpriest of Prechistoye-Naumovo, Yaroslavl, and Peter Markov, Archpriest of Korenevo, Moscow (1938)
 New Hieromartyrs Simeon Kulgavets and Sergius Lubomudrov, priests (1938)
 New Hieromartyr Alexander Abissov, Priest (1942)

Other commemorations

 Repose of Schema-Abbot Theodore of Valaam Monastery (1937)

Icon gallery

Notes

References

Sources
 February 8 / 21. Orthodox Calendar (Pravoslavie.ru).
 February 21 / 8. Holy Trinity Russian Orthodox Church (A parish of the Patriarchate of Moscow).
 February 8. OCA - The Lives of the Saints.
 The Autonomous Orthodox Metropolia of Western Europe and the Americas. St. Hilarion Calendar of Saints for the year of our Lord 2004. St. Hilarion Press (Austin, TX). p. 13.
 The Eighth Day of the Month of February. Orthodoxy in China.
 February 8. Latin Saints of the Orthodox Patriarchate of Rome.
 The Roman Martyrology. Transl. by the Archbishop of Baltimore. Last Edition, According to the Copy Printed at Rome in 1914. Revised Edition, with the Imprimatur of His Eminence Cardinal Gibbons. Baltimore: John Murphy Company, 1916. pp. 41–42.
 Rev. Richard Stanton. A Menology of England and Wales, or, Brief Memorials of the Ancient British and English Saints Arranged According to the Calendar, Together with the Martyrs of the 16th and 17th Centuries. London: Burns & Oates, 1892. pp. 58–60.
Greek Sources
 Great Synaxaristes:  8 Φεβρουαρίου. Μεγασ Συναξαριστησ.
  Συναξαριστής. 8 Φεβρουαρίου. Ecclesia.gr. (H Εκκλησια Τησ Ελλαδοσ).
Russian Sources
  21 февраля (8 февраля). Православная Энциклопедия под редакцией Патриарха Московского и всея Руси Кирилла (электронная версия). (Orthodox Encyclopedia - Pravenc.ru).

February in the Eastern Orthodox calendar